Braj Bihari Sharma (1897-1978) was an Indian politician. He was a Member of Parliament , representing Uttar Pradesh in the Rajya Sabha the upper house of India's Parliament representing the Indian National Congress.

References

Rajya Sabha members from Uttar Pradesh
Indian National Congress politicians
1897 births
1978 deaths